Yuanshi County is located in the southwest of Hebei Province, North China,  to the south of Shijiazhuang, the provincial capital. Yuanshi County borders Gaoyi County to the south, Zhao County and Luancheng District to the east, Jingxing County to the west and Luquan District to its north.

The region is dominated by hills and valleys, with flat plains at the base of the Taihang Mountains. The area has a semi-arid climate, marked by continental monsoons and droughts during the Spring.

Yuanshi became a county during the Han Dynasty and is the birthplace of Emperor Ming of Han, Li Mu and Li Zuoche.

Yuanshi was the site of the Hebei tractor rampage.

Administrative divisions
Subdistricts:
 Chengqu Subdistrict

Towns:
Huaiyang, Nanyin, Nanzuo, Yincun, Jicun, Songcao

Townships:
Dongzhang Township, Zhaotong Township, Macun Township, Beichu Township, Suyang Township, Sucun Township, Beizheng Township, Qianxian Township, Heishuihe Township

Climate

References

External links

County-level divisions of Hebei
Shijiazhuang